The Jacksonville Landing shooting, also known as the Jacksonville shooting, was a mass shooting that occurred at a video game tournament for the video game Madden NFL 19 in Jacksonville Landing, Jacksonville, Florida, on August 26, 2018, at about 1:30 pm (EDT). A lone gunman, David Katz, shot and killed two people and injured another ten before killing himself.

Shooting
The GLHF (Good Luck Have Fun) Game Bar, a video game venue in the Jacksonville Landing indoor marketplace, hosted a Madden NFL 19 video gaming tournament on August 26, 2018, with around 130 to 150 participants and onlookers. After one of the participants, David Katz, lost a game, he refused to shake the hand of the winner and left the tournament. Soon after, he returned with one of the two handguns he had brought to the event.

Katz fired 12 shots, killing two people and wounding ten others, then committed suicide. One more sustained injuries while fleeing. A tournament announcer said that he had been interviewing the first victim before he was fatally shot, and that he had been intentionally targeted. The gunman then turned and began shooting indiscriminately.

Gunfire was first reported on social media at 1:34 pm EDT by tournament participants. The event's Twitch stream recorded footage of the shooting, which was later uploaded to YouTube.

The Jacksonville Sheriff's Office urged individuals to stay away from the location at 2:13 p.m. EDT, and SWAT officers evacuated and searched the area. First responders arrived on the scene within two minutes of the first 911 call, and arrived at 1:36 pm EDT. The president of the firefighters union told reporters that they were training in the area when victims had run up to them for help. Due to the location being next to the St. Johns River, the Coast Guard was called in to sweep the surrounding waterways.

Victims

Fatalities 

 Elijah Clayton, age 22, from Woodland Hills, California, was a professional gamer known by the aliases "True" and "Trueboy". He had reportedly made a last-minute decision to attend the Jacksonville tournament. A video circulating on social media after the shooting appeared to show a red dot on Clayton's chest from the laser sight on Katz's handgun.
 Taylor Robertson, age 27, from Ballard, West Virginia, was a professional gamer known by the alias "SpotMePlzzz".

Non-fatal injuries 
Eleven people were taken to hospitals for treatment of their injuries. Some of the injured had been able to leave the bar and sought assistance from first responders. Two others had driven themselves to the hospital. Of those injured, ten individuals received gunshot wounds and one person was injured attempting to flee from the location. The day after the incident Memorial Hospital released a statement that one individual had minor injuries, and three were in good condition, and UF Health announced that four victims had been released, with two still admitted.

Perpetrator 
The shooter, David Katz, was a 24-year-old professional Madden player from Baltimore, Maryland, who had been attending the Jacksonville tournament as a participant. Katz had lost a few rounds in the competition, which prevented him from reaching the finals. Fellow competitors reported that he had been "acting weird" and refused to shake hands with them after losing the competition. His pseudonyms included "Bread", "mrslicedbread", "RavensChamp", "ravens2012champ" and "TREXHAVAHARTATAK". He had previously won $10,000 in a 2017 Madden Tournament. Katz had a history of mental illness and was prescribed anti-psychotic medicine. He was diagnosed with dysthymia and oppositional disorder not otherwise specified and had been involuntarily  committed to mental hospitals on numerous occasions.

Investigation 
The Jacksonville Sheriff's Office used Twitter to announce that there were fatalities at the scene at 2:45 p.m. EDT, and that one suspect was dead at the scene at 2:53 p.m. EDT. Initially, it was unknown whether there were additional gunmen, but later, officials confirmed that there was only one suspect in the shooting. He was armed with a .45 caliber handgun and a 9mm handgun, with the Sheriffs Office stating that one of the weapons was equipped with an aftermarket laser sight attached to the trigger guard. The weapons had been stored in his vehicle, and purchased legally in Baltimore, Maryland.

The Sheriff's Office issued an update at 7:37 p.m. EDT, indicating that the FBI were involved in the investigation, and that there was coordination with officers in the suspect's hometown, Baltimore, Maryland. Police and federal agents visited a house in South Baltimore, which was identified as Katz's father's home. They added that updates would be posted on their Twitter account. Electronic Arts, who published Madden NFL 19 and had approved the competition, cooperated with the investigations.

The Sheriff's Office reported that the incident is being investigated as a criminal act and not as an act of terrorism.

Lawsuit 
As of August 30, 2018, at least one participant had filed a lawsuit against the tournament sponsor Electronic Arts, the game manufacturer, the mall, and the restaurant where the incident occurred. The lawsuit claims "to hold those responsible accountable, and to ensure that gamers ... are able to get together to pursue their passion without having to fear for their lives".

Response 

Participants and sponsors of participants took to social media to express safety, injuries, and recollections of the incident. Electronic Arts (EA) released a statement saying their "most heartfelt sympathies" went out to the families of the victims and those who were injured and that their focus was on those affected and aiding law enforcement. The publisher would later cancel the three remaining Madden Classic qualifier tournaments in order to reevaluate safety protocols for future live events.  EA further donated  as charity for the victims of the shooting and will set up a fund for others to be able to contribute.

Organizers of several video game-based exhibitions, including PAX, Game Developers Conference, Insomnia Gaming Festival and Electronic Entertainment Expo, as well as other esports tournaments such as the League of Legends Championship Series and Evolution Championship Series (EVO) announced that they would take additional security measures at their upcoming events to protect the safety of their exhibitors and attendees in wake of the shooting. The event has also raised concern about increasing security at other esports events in the future to levels similarly seen in other professional sporting events.

The BBC initial coverage of the shooting compared it to other shootings in the state of Florida, including the Stoneman Douglas High School shooting, the killings of Christina Grimmie, Trayvon Martin, and XXXTentacion, and the Orlando nightclub shooting. As the incident occurred 54 hours before the state polls closed in the gubernatorial primary elections, the political and gun law ramifications became political talking points.

U.S. President Donald Trump contacted Florida Governor Rick Scott, offering federal assistance in response to the shooting.

A  23-year-old Minnesota man who operated a Reddit account named "Ravenchamps" was subjected to a harassment campaign by QAnon and Trump supporters, after far-right conspiracy theorist websites InfoWars and The Gateway Pundit, as well as far right commentator Mike Cernovich and reporter Ian Miles Cheong, misidentified him as the suspect and highlighted several anti-Trump statements made under his moniker. In response the owner made fun of the users of the QAnon-affiliated subreddit r/GreatAwakening, telling them "Y'all are seriously some bad researchers,"  and held an "Ask me Anything". He told The Washington Post that he did not receive any threats and that he was taking the campaign in stride. The Gateway Pundit subsequently posted a retraction to their article.

Memorials and tributes 
Video game developer Bungie issued a statement that all its "Bungie and Destiny channels" would observe a day of silence in memory of the victims on August 27, 2018. Bethesda, a major video game publisher, also issued its condolences, stating that they will "support efforts from the @EA family however [they] can." OpTic Gaming announced shortly after that they will be holding a charity livestream on August 31, 2018, with all proceeds going towards the families of the victims. GLHF also hosted a vigil in front of the restaurant doors, which was attended by hundreds of people. Madden NFL 19 developer EA Sports released a statement the same day expressing their sympathies and stated that they were working with authorities to figure out what happened.

References

2018 crimes in Florida
2018 in video gaming
2018 mass shootings in the United States
2018 murders in the United States
21st century in Jacksonville, Florida
August 2018 crimes in the United States
August 2018 events in the United States
Esports competitions in the United States
Madden NFL
Mass shootings in Florida
Murder–suicides in Florida
Deaths by firearm in Florida
Video game controversies
Attacks in the United States in 2018
Filmed killings
Mass shootings in the United States
Livestreamed crimes
2018 active shooter incidents in the United States